Transmembrane protein 22 is a protein that in humans is encoded by the TMEM22 gene.

See also
EamA

References

Further reading